Chung Kuang-tien (born 13 August 1989) is a Taiwanese football goalkeeper who currently plays for National Pei Men Senior High School football team and Tatung F.C. He made his first national team debut in 2010 AFC Challenge Cup qualifier against Brunei on April 8, 2009.

Playing history
 National Pei Men Senior High School football team
 Tatung F.C.

References

External links

1989 births
Living people
Taiwanese footballers
Tatung F.C. players
Chinese Taipei international footballers
Association football goalkeepers